South Lochaber (Loch Abar a Deas)  is a small community in the Canadian province of Nova Scotia, located in the Municipality of the District of Saint Mary's in Guysborough County.

External links
Official website of the Community of Lochaber
South Lochaber on Destination Nova Scotia

Communities in Guysborough County, Nova Scotia
General Service Areas in Nova Scotia